The group stage for the First Citizens Cup began on 8 June.

Groups

The teams were drawn into 2 groups of 5 teams, who will play each other once. The top two teams will advance to the semifinals.

All times U.S. Eastern Daylight Time (UTC−4)

Group Immortelle

Story of Round 1.

Story of Round 2.

Story of Round 5.

Final 30 mins were postponed due to weather

Group Abercrombie

Story of round 1

Story of Round 2

See also
 2018 First Citizens Cup

References

Trinidad and Tobago League Cup